This is a list of hilltowns in southern Italy.

Campania
Ariano Irpino
Frigento
Greci
Guardia Lombardi
Lacedonia
Montaguto
Montecalvo Irpino
Montefalcone di Val Fortore
Montefusco
Montemiletto
Trevico
Villanova del Battista
 Apulia
Bovino
Castelnuovo della Daunia
Monteleone di Puglia
Panni
Roseto Valfortore
San Marco la Catola
Sant'Agata di Puglia
 Basilicata
Anzi
Ferrandina
Forenza
Grassano
Nemoli
Pietrapertosa
Rivello
Salandra
Calabria
Albidona
Alessandria del Carretto
Bova
Castroregio
Montegiordano
Santa Severina
Sicily
Agira
Calascibetta
Centuripe
Enna
Floresta
Gangi
Montalbano Elicona
San Mauro Castelverde
Troina

Italy geography-related lists